Suvin (also Romanized as Sūvīn; also known as Sovīn) is a village in Garmeh-ye Shomali Rural District, Kandovan District, Meyaneh County, East Azerbaijan Province, Iran. At the 2006 census, its population was 262, in 49 families.

References 

Populated places in Meyaneh County